Russia–Senegal relations are the bilateral foreign relations between Russia and Senegal.  Russian has an embassy in Dakar and Senegal has an embassy in Moscow.

Bilateral Relations 
The Soviet Union established diplomatic relations with Senegal on June 14, 1962. Political relations are stable. In September 2007, Foreign Minister Sergei Lavrov visited Senegal on an official visit, during which he held talks with  Senegalese President Abdoulaye Wade, Prime Minister and Minister of Foreign Affairs. On 18–21 June 2018, the President of Senegal, Macky Sall, went to Moscow to attend the 2018 FIFA World Cup opening ceremony.

See also 
 Foreign relations of Russia
 Foreign relations of Senegal

References

External links 
  Documents on the Russia–Senegal relationship from the Russian Ministry of Foreign Affairs
  Embassy of Russia in Dakar
  Embassy of Senegal in Moscow

 
Senegal
Senegal
Bilateral relations of Senegal